is a passenger railway station  located in the town of Wakasa, Yazu District, Tottori Prefecture, Japan. It is operated by the third sector company Wakasa Railway.

Lines

Station layout
The station consists of one ground-level side platform serving a single bi-directional track, with an additional siding track and turntable. A JNR Class C12 locomotive converted to run on compressed air, is on display at this station. The wooden station building and platform were built in 1930 and were registered as Tangible Cultural Property in 2008. This designation also includes the Storage room, Lamp room, western box guard, eastern box guard, garage, turntable, water tower, bridge and drainage ditch.

Adjacent stations

|-
!colspan=5|Wakasa Railway

History
Wakasa Station opened on 1 December 1930.

Passenger statistics
In fiscal 2018, the station was used by an average of 249 passengers daily.

Surrounding area
 Wakasa Jinja
  Route 29
  Route 482

See also
List of railway stations in Japan

References

External links 

Railway stations in Tottori Prefecture
Railway stations in Japan opened in 1930
Wakasa, Tottori
Registered Tangible Cultural Properties